Chaplain Corps might refer to:
United States Army Chaplain Corps
United States Navy Chaplain Corps
United States Air Force Chaplain Corps

See also:
Chaplain
Military Chaplain
Armed Forces Chaplains Board, the U.S. board made up of the three Chiefs of Chaplains and three active-duty Deputy Chiefs of Chaplains of the Army, Navy, and Air Force